Iqbal Ahmed is an Indian politician. In 2011 and 2016 he is elected as MLA of Khanakul Vidhan Sabha Constituency in West Bengal Legislative Assembly. He is an All India Trinamool Congress politician.

References

Living people
Trinamool Congress politicians from West Bengal
West Bengal MLAs 2011–2016
West Bengal MLAs 2016–2021
Year of birth missing (living people)